The Surafend massacre was the premeditated massacre of many male inhabitants from the Arab village of Surafend (now the area of Tzrifin in Israel) and a Bedouin camp in Palestine by soldiers of the ANZAC Mounted Division on 10 December 1918. The massacre, believed to have been in response to the murder of a New Zealand soldier by a villager, caused a significant rift between the Division and its Commander-in-Chief, General Sir Edmund Allenby.

Context
The village of Surafend (also known as Sarafand) was near the camps of the three brigades of the ANZAC Mounted Division: the New Zealand Mounted Rifles Brigade, and the Australian 1st and 2nd Light Horse Brigades. The proximity of the village, coupled with a perceived general British Army acceptance and dismissal of petty crime by the local Arabs, meant that thefts and even murders took place regularly with little to no redress from the Imperial forces. The reluctance of the British to punish or avenge such crimes led to a build-up of resentment among the division towards both the native Arabs and British General Headquarters.

The massacre
On the night of 9–10 December 1918, a New Zealand soldier, 65779 Trooper Leslie Lowry, was woken around midnight when his kitbag, which he was using as a pillow, was stolen from his tent. Lowry pursued the thief outside of the camp, where he was apparently shot. Lowry was found by Corporal C.H. Carr, who had heard the sound of a struggle and a cry for help, lying in the sand about 40 metres from the tent lines, bleeding from a bullet wound to the chest. He died just as a doctor arrived at approximately 1:30a.m. on Tuesday 10 December, having said nothing. The camp was roused, and a group of New Zealand soldiers followed the footprints of the thief, which ended about a hundred yards before the village of Surafend.

Soldiers set up a cordon around the village, and ordered the sheikhs of the village to surrender the murderer, but they denied any knowledge of the incident or its perpetrator. The death was brought to the attention of the staff of the division the following day, and a court of inquiry was conducted at first light by Major Magnus Johnson. Plaster casts of the footprints were taken, and the bullet that killed Lowry was determined to have been fired by a Colt .45 pistol, which was not on general issue to NZMR troops, but was common amongst Turkish and Arab forces. By nightfall there had been no response on what action, if any, should be taken. According to the police report, there was no evidence linking anyone from the village to the murder. The report states:

At 0930 on the 10th December 1918 the Police commenced to search the Village and found no trace whatsoever of the culprit, or even any other individual suspected of the crime. The only material clue was that of a Native Cap (similar to headgear worn by Bedouins) which was picked up by a mate of the deceased, and handed to me by Captain Cobb. This was found on the scene where the Soldier was shot and killed.

The following day, the men of the New Zealand Mounted Rifles prepared for what was to take place that night. Early in the evening, around two hundred soldiers entered the village, expelling the women and children. Armed with heavy sticks and bayonets, the soldiers then set upon the remaining villagers whilst also burning the houses. Somewhere upwards of about 40 people may have been killed in the attack on Surafend and the outlying Bedouin camp. The casualty figures depend upon the testimony from the reporting authority. There is no certain figure and one account puts the figure at more than 100. There were also unknown numbers of injured villagers who were tended to by the field ambulance units.

Aftermath
The massacre at Surafend was both visible and audible to the nearby division headquarters, and the division's Commander-in-Chief, General Sir Edmund Allenby, was ordered by General Headquarters to find and discipline those who took part in the killings, in particular those who led and organised the attack. The New Zealanders stood firm in solidarity and refused to name any individual soldiers responsible, and thus no-one could be definitively charged and disciplined for the massacre.

General Allenby ordered the division to the square at headquarters, where ignoring the salute of Commanding Officer Chaytor he expressed his fury at their actions in no uncertain terms and employed unexpectedly strong language, including calling them "cowards and murderers". According to Gullett's Official History of Australia in the War of 1914–1918, the division was fully expecting harsh military discipline for the massacre, and would have accepted this without resentment; however, Allenby's abusive outburst, although leaving them unpunished, fueled a great amount of resentment and bitterness that their commanding officer would speak of the brigades in such a manner. The feeling among the mounted division was only intensified by Allenby's withdrawing his awards recommendations for members of the division  and his silence towards them over the following year. It was only in June 1919 that Allenby was informed by an Australian journalist of the resentment in the division following his outburst, and he subsequently wrote a glowing tribute to the Australian Light Horse troops, bidding them farewell and thanking them for their heroic work in Palestine and Syria.

No one was charged for the massacre, but the £2060.11.3d (£ in ) was paid to authorities in Palestine to rebuild the village. The British government contributed £686 due to a small number of Scottish soldiers who had participated and in 1921 requested that Australia and New Zealand contribute the remaining two thirds. Australia did not contest its liability and quickly paid £515.2.9d to Britain. New Zealand however objected, but eventually under British pressure paid £858.11.5d in May 1921.

Australian involvement
At the time the destruction of Surafend was occurring, the YMCA was screening a movie which was watched by many men of the Anzac Mounted Division. On hearing reports about the fighting, the Anzac Mounted Division Headquarters ordered the division to "stand to" with an immediate roll call to be taken and every man's location accounted for at that moment. The result of this roll call was that the location of most Australians were accounted for. In addition to the rolls, police pickets surrounded the village, finding many Australians viewing the burning houses. These were ordered back to their units. No police report indicated the presence of Australian soldiers in the village.

That being so, involvement of Australian soldiers in the massacre at Surafend had been assumed, but never proven. Historian Henry Gullett's volume of the  Official History of Australia in the War of 1914–1918 mentioned that New Zealand troops had conducted the massacre and the destruction of the village, but with the "hearty support" and "full sympathy" of the Australians.

In 2009, journalist Paul Daley while undertaking research for his  book, Beersheba discovered an audio recording in the archives of the Australian War Memorial in which Australian former Light Horseman Ted O'Brien described how he and his comrades had "had a good issue of rum" and "went through [the village] with a bayonet." O'Brien described the actions he and his fellow Australians took as "ungodly" and "a real bad thing".

See also

References

Further reading

External links
 Australian Light Horse Studies Centre Surafend, the massacre, Palestine, 10 December 1918. This resource contains various transcribed testimonies and military police reports.  
Surafend Affair, 10-11 December 1918 [1 of 2. Page 1 of the official report of the Court of Inquiry into the death of Leslie Lowry.
Surafend Affair, 10-11 December 1918 [2 of 2. Page 2 of the official report of the Court of Inquiry into the death of Leslie Lowry.
Burning of Surafend Village, Palestine. A letter from new Zealand’s military representative in London which gives the cost of rebuilding the village.

Massacres in Mandatory Palestine
1918 in military history
Military history of Australia during World War I
New Zealand in World War I
Mass murder in 1918
Massacres of men
Violence against men in Asia
World War I massacres
World War I crimes by the British Empire and Commonwealth
Australian war crimes
New Zealand war crimes
Massacres in 1918